Zhaksykylysh is a village in Aral District, Kyzylorda Region of southern-central Kazakhstan, It is the administrative center and the only settlement of the Zhaksykylysh District (KATO code - 433246200).  Population:

References

Populated places in Kyzylorda Region